Pagny-le-Château is a commune of the Côte-d'Or department in eastern France. In 2017 its population was 514.

The village is situated between Seurre and Saint-Jean-de-Losne, in the "Val de Saône" on the RD 976.

History
Over the centuries, the village has had several names. The first one was Pancium. Afterwards, it was called Paygnay-le-Château, then Pagny-la-Brûlée. Even though the fortified castles were destroyed the village is now called Pagny-le-Château.

Château
Although the château was destroyed in 1768, there remains its Renaissance chapel dated 1536. It contains the tomb of Jean de Vienne (died 1455) and that of Jean de Longwy (died 1460) and Jeanne de Vienne (died 1472), with alabaster effigies.

Population

The inhabitants are called Pagnitains.

Administration

See also
Communes of the Côte-d'Or department

References

Photos gallery

External links

 Official site of Pagny-le-Château
 Site of the chapelle castrale
 Site of Lac de Chour

Communes of Côte-d'Or